Bob the Builder, also known simply as Bob, is the title character and protagonist of the British preschool animated television programme of the same name.  He is a general contractor with his own construction yard in Bobsville, Sunflower Valley, Fixham Harbour, or Spring City depending on the programme.

Catchphrase
Bob's catchphrase, "yes we can", is a response to other characters saying "Can we fix it?". "Can we fix it?" is also the name of the theme song, which became a top seller in the UK.

Design
The character's appearance was created by Curtis Jobling. His character sketches initially showed him with a moustache but this made him seem too old for the target audience of preschool children and so he was then restyled as clean-shaven. As stop motion animation requires frequent repositioning of the models, Bob was given large feet for stability.

When the series was sold internationally, some changes had to be made to make him more acceptable to other cultures. For Japan, the character was shown with all five fingers on each hand, rather than his usual four. This was done because, in that society, a missing finger indicates membership of the criminal Yakuza clans. However, none of the footage was altered.

In 2014, the toy company Mattel bought the rights to the character and gave him a Hollywood-style makeover, making him seem younger and slimmer and more realistically proportioned. This was not well-received on social media, where the new look was described as creepy and unconvincing. Like in Japan, his 2015 redesign has five fingers on each hand, instead of four.

Appearances
Bob has appeared in every episode in the programme and all related media, except for one episode, which was a spin-off teaser featuring Dingle the Shingler.
He officially first appeared in the episode Scoop Saves the Day that premiered on 12 April 1999 and has been going ever since 1999.

Legacy
The character of Bob the Builder has helped to change negative stereotypes of construction workers among preschool children.

References

Fictional construction workers
Television characters introduced in 1999
Bob the Builder
Children's television characters
Male characters in animation
Male characters in television
Animated characters introduced in 1999